The A79 motorway is a motorway in the Netherlands. It is located entirely in the Dutch province of Limburg.

Overview
The motorway, 17 km long and entirely two lanes, connects the A2 motorway at the interchange Kruisdonk with Valkenburg, the A76 motorway at interchange Kunderberg, and the city of Heerlen.

The Kruisdonk interchange can be used only by traffic between the A79 and the southern part of the A2. Traffic from and to the northern part of the A2 must local roads.

No European routes follow the A79 motorway.

Exit list

External links

Motorways in the Netherlands
Motorways in Limburg (Netherlands)
South Limburg (Netherlands)
Transport in Heerlen
Meerssen